Jason Sampson (born 1993) is an Irish hurler who plays for Offaly Championship club Shinrone and at inter-county level with the Offaly senior hurling team. He usually lines out as a forward.

Career

Born in Shinrone, County Offaly, Sampson first came to hurling prominence at juvenile and underage levels with the Shinrone club before eventually progressing onto the club's senior team. He first appeared on the inter-county scene with the Offaly minor team before later lining out with the under-21 side. Sampson made his first appearance with the Offaly senior hurling team during the 2016 National League. He secured his first silverware during the 2021 season, when Offaly claimed the National League Division 2A and Christy Ring Cup titles. His brother, Killian Sampson, also plays with Offaly.

Honours

Shinrone
Offaly Senior Hurling Championship: 2022 (c)

Offaly
Christy Ring Cup: 2021 
National Hurling League Division 2A: 2021

References

External links
 Jason Sampson appearance record

1993 births
Living people
Shinrone hurlers
Offaly inter-county hurlers